Kim Na-young (born December 31, 1991) is a South Korean singer and actress who gained immense popularity through social media exposure on New Year's Eve 2015, when her single "What If It Was Going" topped Melon's (South Korea's biggest music streaming site) music charts, holding the top place for five days, and high spots on other streaming sites. She has recorded several soundtracks, including "Once Again" for Descendants of the Sun.

As a solo artist, she released three studio albums, 26 singles and 22 soundtrack appearances.

Music career 

She debuted as a singer in 2012, after which she took the unusual route of busking in the Hongdae area, where a video clip of her singing on a cold winter night went viral and attracted over 1 million views.

She has had a few TV appearances and was a contestant on Mnet's Superstar K in 2013, but did not reach the finals. From her appearance on Superstar K, her singing skills were noticed in the K-pop industry and she did a 2014 original soundtrack for a Korean drama.

New Year's Eve 2015 viral success 

Her sudden rise in popularity, without being known much by mainstream media, occurred with the release of the viral video clip "What If It Was Going" and was called remarkable. Social media experts said the video's reception, which "spread like wildfire among young trendsetters," was because "mobile oriented social networks are changing the traditional routes to success for singers." She called the success, which coincided on her birthday, December 31, an unforgettable birthday gift.

Descendants of the Sun OST

She has recorded a number of soundtracks, including those for The Girl Who Sees Smells, Orange Marmalade and Bubble Gum. In March 2016, she and Mad Clown collaborated for a well received OST "Once Again" for Descendants of the Sun, and used as background music when the drama's leading roles flashed back to old memories.

2019: First music show win
On June 23, 2019, she received her first music show win on SBS' Inkigayo with her single "To Be Honest".

2020: Do You Like Brahms? 
On September 21, 2020, the original soundtrack Kim sang titled "Dream" was released for the South Korean television series Do You Like Brahms? as the sixth part.

Discography

Studio albums

Singles

Soundtrack appearances

Filmography

Television shows

Theater

Awards and nominations

References

External links
 (in Korean)

1991 births
Living people
South Korean contemporary R&B singers
Seoul Institute of the Arts alumni
21st-century South Korean singers
21st-century South Korean women singers